Mary Ellen "Mala" Powers (December 20, 1931 – June 11, 2007) was an American actress.

Early life
Powers was born in San Francisco, California, and raised in Los Angeles. Her father was a United Press executive, while her mother was a minister. Powers later told a reporter, "I've worked in show business since I've been seven." Powers attended the Max Reinhardt Junior Workshop, where she played her first role in a play before a live audience. She continued with her drama lessons, and a year later, aged 10, she auditioned and won a part in the 1942 Little Tough Guys film Tough as They Come.

Career 
At the age of 16, Powers began working in radio drama, before becoming a film actress in 1950. Her first movie roles were in Outrage and Edge of Doom in 1950. That same year, Stanley Kramer signed Powers to star opposite José Ferrer in what may be her most-remembered role, as Roxane in Cyrano de Bergerac. She was nominated for a Golden Globe Award for her part in this movie.

At age 19, while on a USO entertainment tour in Korea in 1951, she contracted a blood disease and nearly died. She was treated with chloromycetin, but a severe allergic reaction resulted in the loss of much of her bone marrow. Powers barely survived, and her recovery took nearly nine months.

She began working again in 1952, including the lead in Rose of Cimarron (1952) and co-starring roles in City Beneath the Sea (1953) and City That Never Sleeps (1953), although she was still taking medication.

Following her recovery, she appeared in Bengazi (1955) and B-movie westerns, such as Rage at Dawn (1955), The Storm Rider (1957), and Sierra Baron (1958), and science fiction films, among them The Unknown Terror (1957), The Colossus of New York (1958), Flight of the Lost Balloon (1961), and Doomsday Machine (1972). She had large roles in Tammy and the Bachelor (1957) and Daddy's Gone A-Hunting (1969). In 1957, she was cast in Man on the Prowl.

She appeared in more than one hundred television series episodes, including Appointment with Adventure, Crossroads, Mr. Adams and Eve, The Restless Gun,  Wagon Train, Bourbon Street Beat, The Rebel, Maverick (in an episode called "Dutchman's Gold" with Roger Moore), The Everglades, Bonanza, The Man from U.N.C.L.E. (The Virtue Affair), Mission: Impossible, Bewitched, The Wild Wild West, The Silent Force, Cheyenne (episodes "Alibi for the Scalped Man" (1960) and "Trouble Street" (1961)), and the Wanted: Dead or Alive episode "Till Death do us Part", with Steve McQueen. In 1962, she portrayed Loretta Opel, a woman with leprosy, in the episode "A Woman's Place" on CBS's Rawhide.

On CBS's Perry Mason courtroom drama, Powers made five appearances in the 1950s and '60s. She was cast as defendant Clair Allison in the 1959 episode "The Case of the Deadly Toy". She also played defendant June Sinclair in the 1960 episode "The Case of the Crying Cherub". Her most memorable role was as defendant Janet Brent, friend of Perry's secretary Della Street (Barbara Hale), in the 1962 episode "The Case of the Weary Watchdog". In 1964, she portrayed blackmail victim turned murderer Helen Bradshaw in "The Case of the Frightened Fisherman", and, in 1966, she played murder victim Elaine Bayler in "The Case of the Scarlet Scandal".

Powers played the recurring character Mona during the final season of Hazel (1965–66).
In 1971, Powers was cast, along with Mike Farrell and June Lockhart, opposite Anthony Quinn in the first of the fifteen episodes of the NBC television series The Man and the City.
Powers narrated Follow the Star, a Christmas album from RCA Victor.

Powers was a successful children's author of Follow the Star, Follow the Year, and Dial a Story. She also revised and edited two books by Enid Blyton after the author's death.

Michael Chekhov Acting Technique
 
Powers trained directly under Michael Chekhov for many years during her time in Hollywood in both group and private sessions. Over this period of time, Powers and Chekhov grew very close, and after his death she was named executrix of the Chekhov estate. She took it upon herself to continue the development and proliferation of the Chekhov Technique throughout the United States and the world. Powers was instrumental in publishing Chekhov's books On the Technique of Acting, To the Actor, and The Path of the Actor. She also published Chekhov's audio series "On Theatre and the Art of Acting", to which she added a 60-page study guide. She co-narrated with Gregory Peck a documentary on Chekhov entitled "From Russia To Hollywood" which was co-produced by her colleague Lisa Loving.

National Michael Chekhov Association (NMCA)
From 1993 to 2006 Powers taught the Chekhov Technique during the summer acting program at the University of Southern Maine for the Michael Chekhov Theatre Institute, training actors and teachers of acting. It was during this time that Powers co-founded the National Michael Chekhov Association (NMCA) with teaching colleagues Wil Kilroy and Lisa Dalton, who continue to teach the curriculum developed by the trio in Maine.

Personal life
She married Monte Vanton in 1954, and they had a son, Toren Vanton. The couple divorced in 1962, and in 1970 Powers married M. Hughes Miller, a book publisher who died in 1989.

Powers was a Democrat who was supportive of Adlai Stevenson's campaign during the 1952 presidential election.

Death
Powers died from complications of leukemia on June 11, 2007, at Providence St. Joseph Medical Center in Burbank, California. She was survived by her son, Toren Vanton. Shortly before her death, she had been on a lecture tour at universities.

She was patron of the Michael Chekhov Studio in London. She has a star on the Hollywood Walk of Fame at 6360 Hollywood Boulevard. She was cremated at the Hollywood Hills Forest Lawn Memorial Park and her ashes returned to family.

Radio appearances

Partial filmography

 Tough As They Come (1942) as Esther Clark (uncredited)
 Edge of Doom (1950) as Julie
 Outrage (1950) as Ann Walton
 Cyrano de Bergerac (1950) as Roxane
 Rose of Cimarron (1952) as Rose of Cimarron
 City Beneath the Sea (1953) as Terry McBride
 City That Never Sleeps (1953) as Sally 'Angel Face' Connors
 Geraldine (1953) as Janey Edwards
 The Yellow Mountain (1954) as Nevada Wray
 Rage at Dawn (1955) as Laura Reno
 Bengazi (1955) as Aileen Donovan
 The Storm Rider (1957) as Tay Rorick
 Tammy and the Bachelor (1957) as Barbara Bissle
 The Unknown Terror (1957) as Gina Matthews
 Death in Small Doses (1957) as Val Owens
 Man on the Prowl (1957) as Marian Wood
 The Colossus of New York (1958) as Anne Spensser
 Sierra Baron (1958) as Sue Russell
 The Restless Gun (1958) Episode "Take Me Home"
 The Restless Gun (1959) Episode "The Lady and the Gun"
 Bonanza (1959) Episode "The Philip Deidesheimer Story"
 Bronco (1960) Episode "Montana Passage" as Ruth Miller
 Fear No More (1961) as Sharon Carlin
 Flight of the Lost Balloon (1961) as Ellen Burton
 The Wild, Wild West (1966) Episode "The Night of the Big Blast" as Lily Fortune
 Rogue's Gallery (1968) as Maggie
 Daddy's Gone A-Hunting (1969) as Meg Stone
 Doomsday Machine aka Escape from Planet Earth (1972) as Major Georgianna Bronski
 Where the Wind Dies (1976)
 Six Tickets to Hell (1981)
 Hitters (2002) as Mama Theresa

References

External links 
 
 
 Michael Chekhov Centre UK and Michael Chekhov Studio London

1931 births
2007 deaths
American film actresses
American television actresses
Actresses from San Francisco
Deaths from leukemia
Deaths from cancer in California
20th-century American actresses
21st-century American actresses
California Democrats